Tabanus subsimilis is a species of horse fly in the family Tabanidae.

Distribution
United States, Mexico.

References

Tabanidae
Insects described in 1859
Taxa named by Luigi Bellardi
Diptera of North America